John Verney, 1st Viscount Fermanagh (5 November 1640 – 23 June 1717), known as Sir John Verney, 2nd Baronet, between 1696 and 1703, was an English peer, merchant and Tory politician who sat in the House of Commons from 1710 to 1717.

Early life
Verney was the second and only surviving son of Sir Ralph Verney, 1st Baronet, and his wife Mary Blacknall, daughter of John Blacknall. He accompanied his father into his French exile, aged eight, and was educated at Blois for the following five years. After the family's return to England, he joined James Fleetwood's school at Barn Elms and in 1655 went to another school in Kensington. Thereafter Verney worked for a Levant merchant, making expeditions to Mesopotamia and Cyprus. On 27 May 1680, he married Elizabeth Palmer, daughter of Ralph Palmer, at Westminster Abbey After her death in 1686, Verney married a second time to  Mary Lawley, daughter of Sir Francis Lawley, 2nd Baronet, on 10 July 1692, also at Westminster Abbey. She died in childbed only two years later and their newborn son shortly thereafter. Verney married as his third wife Elizabeth Baker, daughter of his neighbour Daniel Baker, on 8 April 1696 at Kensington. In 1696, he succeeded his father as baronet.

Career
Verney was several years assistant to the Royal African Company and served as governor of Bethlem Royal Hospital. He contested the county of Buckinghamshire in the elections of 1696 and 1698 and the town of Buckingham in 1701; each time unsuccessfully. On 16 June 1703, Verney was created Viscount of the County of Fermanagh along with the subsidiary title Baron Verney of Belturbet, in the County of Cavan. Both titles were in the Peerage of Ireland and hence didn't prevent him being returned as Member of Parliament for Buckinghamshire  at the 1710 general election. He was returned again for Buckinghamshire in  1713. At the 1715 general election he was returned unopposed instead as MP for Amersham on the Drake interest and represented it until his death in 1717.

Death and legacy
The Viscount Fermanagh died aged 76 and was buried in Middle Claydon in Buckinghamshire a week later. He had by his first wife, a son and three daughters. He was succeeded in his titles by his only surviving son Ralph.

References

1640 births
1717 deaths
British MPs 1710–1713
British MPs 1713–1715
British MPs 1715–1722
Members of the Parliament of Great Britain for English constituencies
Viscounts in the Peerage of Ireland
Peers of Ireland created by Queen Anne
John